San Giacomo delle Segnate is a comune (municipality) in the Province of Mantua in the Italian region Lombardy, located about  southeast of Milan and about  southeast of Mantua. 

San Giacomo delle Segnate borders the following municipalities: Concordia sulla Secchia, Quistello, San Giovanni del Dosso.

References

Cities and towns in Lombardy